Taoyuan City electoral constituencies consist of 6 single-member constituencies in Taoyuan, Taiwan, each represented by a member of the Republic of China Legislative Yuan.

Current constituencies

Taoyuan City was formerly Taoyuan County and all constituencies were named accordingly.
Taoyuan City Constituency I - Luzhu, Guishan, Taoyuan (11 villages)
Taoyuan City Constituency II - Yangmei, Xinwu, Guanyin, Dayuan
Taoyuan City Constituency III - Zhongli (73 villages)
Taoyuan City Constituency IV - Taoyuan (65 villages) 
Taoyuan City Constituency V - Pingzhen, Longtan
Taoyuan City Constituency VI - Bade, Daxi, Fuxing, Zhongli (12 villages)

Legislators

Liao Cheng-ching resigned in 2009 due to election fraud.

John Wu resigned in 2009 after his election as Taoyuan County magistrate.

Election results

2016

References

Constituencies in Taiwan
Politics of Taoyuan, Taiwan